Sayed Mohammad Hashemi (Dari: سید محمد هاشمی, born 2 March 1994) is an Afghanistan international footballer who plays as a defender for Shaheen Asmayee F.C.

International goals

Honours 
Afghan Premier League: 2013, 2014

References

External links 
 

1994 births
Living people
Afghan footballers
Afghanistan international footballers
Footballers at the 2014 Asian Games
Shaheen Asmayee F.C. players
Sportspeople from Herat
Association football defenders
Asian Games competitors for Afghanistan